Coaltown of Balgonie is a village of 1059 people (2011 census) in south central Fife. It is located on the B9130 road in the heart of Fife, next to the new town of Glenrothes in east-central Scotland. Coaltown has a Scotmid (Co-op) shop with a post office, a pub, a bowling green, a village hall, and a church.

History

Education
Coaltown of Balgonie Primary School was opened in August 1889. It is a village school with two campuses. The main building is at the end of School Road and it sits in a countryside environment. It houses 4 classrooms, toilet block, staff resource base and the usual office provision. The annexe building is the old Miners' Welfare Institute at the top of School Road and houses a classroom along with the kitchen and dining/gym hall. The school has won various Eco-school awards and they have a large nature area outside both buildings.

For secondary education, pupils are catchment allocated to Auchmuty High School, a short distance away, in Glenrothes. There are private bus links to St Paul's Roman Catholic Primary School in Glenrothes and St Andrews R.C. High School in Kirkcaldy.

Transport
Frequent bus services depart the village for Glenrothes and Markinch, with peak time services extended to and from Leven. A short walk away is Bankhead Roundabout, and regular express services throughout central Scotland depart from here, as well as local services to destinations within Fife. The majority of bus services are provided by Stagecoach East Scotland, and a few are run by local bus and coach company Moffat & Williamson.

Although the East Coast Main Line runs through the village, Coaltown does not have a railway station. The nearest options are Glenrothes with Thornton railway station, located in Thornton, providing links to the Fife Circle Line, or Markinch railway station for trains to Inverness, Aberdeen, Dundee, Perth, and Edinburgh. Markinch benefits from having direct access to the new Borders Railway, which re-opened in September 2015.

References

Villages in Fife
Mining communities in Fife